Rammell Mountain ( is located in the Teton Range in the U.S. state of Wyoming. The peak is in the Jedediah Smith Wilderness of Caribou-Targhee National Forest.

References

Mountains of Teton County, Wyoming
Mountains of Wyoming